Erpfting is a borough of Landsberg am Lech in the district of Landsberg in Bavaria in Germany.

Gallery

Landsberg (district)